Khanakul is a town in Hooghly District in the state of West Bengal, India . Khanakul is the birth place of Raja Ramohon Roy. Khanakul is famous for Ratnavali Temple, Gopinath Temple, Radhavallabh Temple, Ghontashor Temple. Khanakul can be reached conveniently by Bus from Kolkata or Tarakeswar. Tarakeswar Station is nearest railway station from Khanakul.

Geography

Location

Area overview
The Arambagh subdivision, presented in the map alongside, is divided into two physiographic parts – the Dwarakeswar River being the dividing line. The western part is upland and rocky – it is extension of the terrain of neighbouring Bankura district. The eastern part is flat alluvial plain area.  The railways, the roads and flood-control measures have had an impact on the area. The area is overwhelmingly rural with 94.77% of the population living in rural areas and 5.23% of the population living in urban areas.

Note: The map alongside presents some of the notable locations in the subdivision. All places marked in the map are linked in the larger full screen map.

Demographics
According to the 2011 Census of India, Khanakul had a total population of 3,489 of which 1,756 (50%) were males and 1,733 (50%) were females. Population in the age range 0–6 years was 734. The total number of literate persons in Khanakul was 2,727 (86.76% of the population over 6 years).

Civic administration

Police station
Khanakul Town police station has jurisdiction over Khanakul I and Khanakul II CD blocks.

CD block HQ
The headquarters of Khanakul I and Khanakul II CD blocks are located at Khanakul Town.

References

Villages in Hooghly district